René González (August 5, 1918 – May 9, 1982) was a Cuban professional baseball player. A native of  Cienfuegos, Cuba, González was a first baseman/outfielder who batted and threw right-handed.

González was a consistent hitter who spent most of his career in Mexican baseball (1947–1949, 1951–1956), where he won three consecutive batting titles (1952–54) including the Triple Crown in 1952. An eight-time .300 hitter, he collected 1144 hits in 3459 at-bats for a .331 batting average during nine seasons.

In 1950, González played for the New York Cubans in the Negro leagues.

After that he played for the Patriotas de Venezuela club of the Venezuelan Professional Baseball League during the 1951–1952 season. He finished with a .357 batting average and led the league in home runs (10), RBI (56), hits (74), doubles (18) and slugging % (.739). Later, he played as a 
reinforcement for the Navegantes del Magallanes in the 1951 Caribbean Series, where he led the Venezuelan offensive with a .333 average and two home runs, while his 11 RBI topped the tournament.

González also played in Cuba and Nicaragua up until 1958, his last season. Following his baseball retirement he returned to his Cuba homeland, where he died at age of 63.

In 1993 he was inducted into the Mexican Professional Baseball Hall of Fame.

Sources
Antero Núñez, José. Series del Caribe. Jefferson, Caracas, Venezuela: Impresos Urbina, C.A., 1987.
Gutiérrez, Daniel. Enciclopedia del Béisbol en Venezuela. Caracas, Venezuela: Editorial La Brújula, C.A., 1997.
MLBlogs.com – René González fue un Gigante en el Caribe (Spanish Biography)

External links
 

1918 births
1982 deaths
Alijadores de Tampico players
Cuban expatriate baseball players in Mexico
Diablos Rojos del México players
Mexican Baseball Hall of Fame inductees
New York Cubans players
Patriotas de Venezuela players
People from Cienfuegos
Rojos del Águila de Veracruz players
Tomateros de Culiacán players
Tuneros de San Luis Potosí players
Cuban expatriate baseball players in Nicaragua
Cuban expatriates in the United States